Safety and Health  is an American magazine  published by the National Safety Council. 

The editor is Melissa J. Ruminski and the circulation is about 86,000 copies. The magazine was launched as National Safety News in 1919.

References

External links

Health magazines
Magazines established in 1919
Occupational safety and health
Weekly magazines published in the United States
Magazines published in Illinois